Aleksander Szymkiewicz (12 November 1858, in Saint Petersburg – 1908, in Tbilisi) was a Polish architect who worked in Georgia (primarily in Tbilisi) in the 1880s–1900s. He was a member of the City Council and municipal architect of Tbilisi from 1885 to 1891.

In Tbilisi, he designed, among others, the building of the Supreme Court of Georgia, the Conservatoire building, the building of the Caucasian Silk Station (now the State Silk Museum), the building of the Rustaveli Theatre (with Cornell K. Tatishchev), and various townhouses, including the Andreoletti's house. He also designed the building of the Shota Rustaveli State University in Batumi and the Court of Appeals in Kutaisi. His designs combined baroque and classical elements.

Gallery

References

1858 births
1908 deaths
Architects from Tbilisi
People from the Russian Empire of Polish descent
19th-century Polish architects